Prior to the promulgation of a new constitution in 2015 after an earthquake, Nepal was divided into five development regions, 14 administrative zones and 75 districts. The 14 administrative zones were grouped into five development regions. Each district is headed by a Chief District Officer (CDO) responsible for maintaining law and order and coordinating the work of field agencies of the various government ministries.

The five development regions of Nepal were (from east to west):

King Birendra divided the entire Kingdom in 4 different regions in 2029 BS (1972).
These regions were as below::

Eastern Development Region,
Central Development Region,
Western Development Region,
Far-Western Development region.
The three regions were:
 Himalyan region consisting of 16 districts.
 Hilly region consisting of 30 districts.
 Terai region consisting of 20 districts from east to west. (Jhapa, Siraha, Saptari, Morang, Sunsari, Dhanusa, Mahottari, Sarlahi, Bara, Parsa, Rautahat, Chitwan, Kapilvastu, Nawalparasi, Rupandehi, Dang, Bake, Bardiya, Kailali, Kanchanpur)

To fill the gap between different parts of the nation by balanced or proportionate development. Eight years later  in 2037(1982), he further divided the nation adding one more separate development region naming it the mid-western development region taking two zones from Far Western Development region Seti and Mahakali.

See also
List of provinces of Nepal
List of zones of Nepal (Former)
List of districts of Nepal
List of village development committees of Nepal (Former)
ISO 3166-2:NP

References

Development
Development
Subdivisions of Nepal
Nepal, Development regions
Former subdivisions of Nepal